"L'Esprit de L'Escalier" is a 2021 fantasy short story by Catherynne M. Valente, retelling the story of Orpheus and Eurydice in a modern setting. It was first published on Tor.com.

Synopsis
Months ago, Orpheus successfully rescued Eurydice from the underworld, but despite his efforts, she is still depressed — and a zombie — and their relationship is failing.

Reception
"L'Esprit de L'Escalier" was a finalist for the 2022 Hugo Award for Best Novelette and the 2022 Locus Award for Best Novelette.

Publishers Weekly called it "clever" and "challenging".

References

External links

 Text of the story, at Tor.com

Fantasy short stories
Works_originally published in online magazines